São Mamede is a civil parish in the municipality of Batalha, part of the Central Region and the Região de Leiria intermunicipal community of Portugal.

History
The civil parish was created on 15 June 1916 by dismemberment of the parish of Reguengo do Fetal by law of president Bernardino Machado.

Geography

Geology

The parish is located on the São Mamede Plateau, a large compact limestone mass part of the Estremadura Limestone Massif and the Serras de Aire e Candeeiros Natural Park. This massif gives the parish a Karst topography, characterized by steep slope valleys, sinkholes, uvalas, pit caves and other multiple caves. The caves of São Mamede are not only strong tourist attractions, but also constitute a historical and patrimonial legacy of recognized worldwide value.

Demographics

In the 60s and early 70s a large flux of emigration drastically reduced the population. The current population is estimated to be around 3,513.

Economy
Though a predominantly rural parish, São Mamede has seen a considerable development in the recent years. The current economic expression of São Mamede is based on the manufacturing and extractive industries and the civil construction sector, with agricultural activity carried out by a minority or carried out on a part-time basis. Religious and cultural tourism also plays an essential role in the local economy, benefiting São Mamede from a strategic location (axis: Batalha Monastery - Fátima Sanctuary), as well as other resources of great interest such as gastronomy, handicrafts and a whole range of other services such as diversified historical, architectural, artistic and cultural heritage, which constitutes a tourist potential duly noted in the various tourist routes in the region of Leiria and Fátima.

Villages

Barreira de Água
Barreiro Grande
Barreirinho Velho
Casais de São Mamede
Casal do Meio
Casal dos Lobos
Casal Suão
Casal Velho
Casal do Gil
Casal Vieira
Covão da Carvalha
Covão do Espinheiro
Crespos
Demó
Lagoa Ruiva
Lapa Furada
Milheirices
Moita de Ervo
Moita do Martinho
Perulheira
Pessegueiro
Portela das Cruzes / Pia do Urso
São Mamede
Vale da Seta
Vale de Barreiras
Vale de Ourém
Vale Sobreiro

Places of interest
Gruta da Moeda
Pia do Urso
Santo António Chappel (built in the 18th century)

References

Towns in Portugal
Populated places in Leiria District